WCJO (97.7 FM) is an American commercial radio station broadcasting a country music format. Licensed to Jackson, Ohio, United States, the station is currently owned by Jackson County Broadcasting, Inc. and features programming from Compass Media Networks.

References

External links

97.7 FM The Bull WCJO on Facebook

CJO